Mamu (also Romanized as Mamū’ and Mamū; also known as Mamū Soflá, Mamū-ye Pā’īn, and Mamū-ye Soflá) is a village in Banesh Rural District, Beyza District, Sepidan County, Fars Province, Iran. At the 2006 census, its population was 390, in 86 families.

References 

Populated places in Beyza County